Nephrops is a genus of lobsters comprising a single extant species, Nephrops norvegicus (the Norway lobster or Dublin Bay prawn), and several fossil species. It was erected by William Elford Leach in 1814, to accommodate N. norvegicus alone, which had previously been placed in genera such as Cancer, Astacus or Homarus. Nephrops means "kidney eye" and refers to the shape of the animal's compound eye.

Although the species in the genus Metanephrops were previously included in Nephrops, molecular phylogenetics suggests that the two genera are not sister taxa, Nephrops  being more closely related to Homarus than either is to Metanephrops.

Most of the fossil species assigned to the genus Nephrops are known only from partial remains, and their affinities are not certain. They include:
Nephrops reedi Carter, 1898 – Pliocene, England
Nephrops costatus Rathbun, 1918 – Pleistocene, Panama
Nephrops maoensis Rathbun, 1920 – Oligocene or Miocene, Dominican Republic
Nephrops aequus Rathbun, 1920 – Oligocene or Miocene, Dominican Republic
Nephrops shastensis Rathbun, 1929 – Cretaceous, California (possibly belongs in Hoploparia)
Nephrops americanus Rathbun, 1935 – Cretaceous, Texas (not similar to Nephrops or Metanephrops)

References

Decapod genera
True lobsters
Extant Cretaceous first appearances
Early Cretaceous crustaceans
Cretaceous California
Late Cretaceous crustaceans
Paleocene crustaceans
Eocene crustaceans
Oligocene crustaceans
Miocene crustaceans
Pliocene crustaceans
Pleistocene crustaceans
Cretaceous Texas
Pliocene England
Pleistocene Panama
Oligocene Dominican Republic
Miocene Dominican Republic
Cretaceous arthropods of North America
Pliocene arthropods of Europe
Oligocene arthropods of North America
Miocene arthropods of North America
Pleistocene arthropods of North America
Fossils of California
Fossils of Texas
Fossils of Panama
Fossils of England
Fossils of the Dominican Republic